Galaxy 5 was a communications satellite operated by PanAmSat from 1992 to 2005. It spent most of its operational life at an orbital location of 176° E. Galaxy 5 was launched on March 14, 1992, with an Atlas launch vehicle from Cape Canaveral Air Force Station, Florida, United States, and covered North America with twenty-four transponders each on the C- and zero in Ku band.

Galaxy 5 was retired in January 2005.

Specifications 
 Apogee: 
 Perigee: 
 Orbital inclination: 10.3°
 Semimajor axis: 
 Orbital period: 1,450.3 minutes
 Propulsion: Star-30C
 Power: Solar cells

References

External links 
 

Satellites using the HS-376 bus
Spacecraft launched in 1992

pt:Galaxy 5